In enzymology, a dolichyl-diphosphooligosaccharide–protein glycotransferase is an enzyme that catalyzes the chemical reaction

dolichyl diphosphooligosaccharide + protein L-asparagine  dolichyl diphosphate + a glycoprotein with the oligosaccharide chain attached by N-glycosyl linkage to protein L-asparagine

Thus, the two substrates of this enzyme are dolichyl diphosphooligosaccharide and protein L-asparagine, whereas its 3 products are dolichyl diphosphate, glycoprotein with the oligosaccharide chain attached by N-glycosyl, and linkage to protein L-asparagine.

This enzyme belongs to the family of glycosyltransferases, specifically the hexosyltransferases.  The systematic name of this enzyme class is dolichyl-diphosphooligosaccharide:protein-L-asparagine oligopolysaccharidotransferase. Other names in common use include dolichyldiphosphooligosaccharide-protein glycosyltransferase, asparagine N-glycosyltransferase, dolichyldiphosphooligosaccharide-protein oligosaccharyltransferase, dolichylpyrophosphodiacetylchitobiose-protein glycosyltransferase, oligomannosyltransferase, oligosaccharide transferase, dolichyldiphosphoryloligosaccharide-protein, and oligosaccharyltransferase.  This enzyme participates in n-glycan biosynthesis and glycan structures - biosynthesis 1.

References

 

EC 2.4.99
Enzymes of known structure